Frederick William Wheeler (January 1888 – 2 January 1918) was an English professional footballer who played as an inside forward in the Southern Football League for Southampton.

Personal life
Wheeler worked as an insurance agent. He served as a sapper in the Royal Engineers during the First World War and was involved in the Italian campaign, being killed in the Montello sector on 2 January 1918. He is buried at Giavera British Cemetery, Arcade.

Career statistics

References

External links
Frederick Wheeler at 11v11

1888 births
1918 deaths
Date of birth missing
Military personnel from Reading, Berkshire
Sportspeople from Reading, Berkshire
Association football inside forwards
English footballers
Southern Football League players
Colne F.C. players
Southampton F.C. players
Eastleigh Athletic F.C. players
Woolston F.C. players
British Army personnel of World War I
Royal Engineers soldiers
British military personnel killed in World War I
Footballers from Berkshire